Cha is a nickname used by people with the given name Charles and its variants. Cha is also both a Chinese and Korean surname

Nickname
Charles Cha Burns (1957 – 2007), Scottish rock guitarist 
Charleen Abigaile Cha Cruz-Behag (born 1988), Filipino volleyball player
Cha Fitzpatrick, nickname of James Fitzpatrick (hurler) (born 1985), Irish hurler
Hideyuki Cha Katō, also known as Kato-chan (born 1943), Japanese comedian and actor
Jarlath Cha Whelan (1939 – 22 March 1996), Irish hurler

Other
Dia Cha (born 1960s), Laotian American author and academic

See also

 Cha (Chinese surname)
 Cha (Korean surname)
Cha. Fra. D'Costa